Mirko Gori (born 4 February 1993) is an Italian footballer who plays for  club Triestina.

Biography
Gori started his career at Frosinone. He was the member of the under-16–17 mixed team in 2008–09 season, as well as for the under-20 reserve team in 2009–10 season. On 31 August 2010 Gori was signed by Serie A club Parma along with Daniele Abbracciante in temporary deals for €25,000 each. Parma purchased half of the registration rights of Abbracciante but sent Gori back to city of Frosinone after 4 league appearances for Parma's reserve. Gori was a player for Frosinone in Berretti under-19 reserve league in 2011–12 season, due to the first team had relegated from Serie B in 2011 to Lega Pro Prima Divisione, made the reserve ineligible to Primavera reserve league dedicated to Serie A and B clubs. However, the reserve won the national title for the club that season.

Gori was promoted to the first team for 2012–13 Lega Pro Prima Divisione. He made his debut in 2012–13 Coppa Italia against Delta Porto Tolle. Gori was the central midfielder in 4–3–3 formation in the second round of the cup. as well as left central midfielder in the first round of the league. He made 18 starts in the league.

Gori also received call-up to Italy Lega Pro representative teams for the last group match of 2011–13 International Challenge Trophy against Russia, as well as a friendly match against Oman.

On 27 January 2022, he joined Alessandria on loan until the end of the 2021–22 season.

On 9 August 2022, Gori signed a three-year contract with Triestina.

References

External links
 AIC profile (data by football.it) 

1993 births
People from Frosinone
Footballers from Lazio
Living people
Italian footballers
Frosinone Calcio players
Parma Calcio 1913 players
U.S. Alessandria Calcio 1912 players
U.S. Triestina Calcio 1918 players
Serie C players
Serie B players
Serie A players
Italy youth international footballers
Association football midfielders
Sportspeople from the Province of Frosinone